Shari Headley (born July 15, 1964) is an American actress and former model. She is best known for her role as Lisa McDowell in the 1988 box-office hit romantic comedy film Coming to America and its sequel Coming 2 America (2021). Headley also has appeared in films The Preacher's Wife (1996) and Johnson Family Vacation (2004).

On television, Headley starred as Detective Mimi Reed in the ABC daytime soap opera All My Children on a regular basis from 1991 to 1994. As lead actress, she starred in the Fox short-lived drama series 413 Hope St. (1997–1998), for which she received NAACP Image Award for Outstanding Actress in a Drama Series nomination. From 2014 to 2016, Headley starred as villainous Jennifer Sallison in the Oprah Winfrey Network primetime soap opera The Haves and the Have Nots.

Early life 
Born in Queens, New York City, Headley is the youngest of four children. She is of part Trinidadian descent. Headley's father worked as a dental technician, and had wanted his daughter to be a doctor. In college, she was a premedical student, minoring in drama and performing in school plays.

In 1984, Headley's modeling career began after her sister submitted a photo of Shari to the Ford Modeling Agency, without Headley's knowledge. She was a finalist in Eileen Ford's Face of the 80s campaign, and joined Ford afterwards. Headley modeled for various magazines, including Glamour and Mademoiselle.

Career 
Headley made her acting debut appearing in an episode of NBC sitcom The Cosby Show in 1985. Headley later appeared on Miami Vice, Quantum Leap, and Matlock. In 1988, she portrayed Lisa McDowell, an heiress to a fast food restaurant, in romantic comedy Coming to America. Eddie Murphy appears as her love interest in the film. Being relatively unknown at the time, the film's director John Landis stated she was chosen in the role for that reason. One reviewer opined she and Murphy "shined" together, though another critic found Headley's performance "bland." The film was a box-office success grossing a worldwide total of $288,752,301.

The following year, Headley had a starring role alongside Louis Gossett Jr. in the short-lived ABC drama series, Gideon Oliver. In the series, she played Zina, the daughter of Gossett's character. Later that year, she co-starred in the Kojak television film series. In 1991, Headley joined the cast of ABC daytime soap opera, All My Children playing police officer Mimi Reed. At the 25th NAACP Image Awards, she received an NAACP Image Award for Outstanding Actress in a Daytime Drama Series nomination, but lost to Victoria Rowell. Headley received a second nomination the following year. She was a regular on All My Children from 1991 to 1994, and returned to the series in 1995 and 2005.

After leaving the soap, she guest-starred on New York Undercover, Walker, Texas Ranger, and Cosby. In 1996, she had a supporting role in the comedy-drama film The Preacher's Wife directed by Penny Marshall. In 1997, Headley landed a leading role as Juanita Barnes in the short-lived FOX drama series, 413 Hope St. alongside Richard Roundtree. The series was cancelled after only ten episodes, but Headley received an NAACP Image Award for Outstanding Actress in a Drama Series nomination for her performance. Headley portrayed Barbara, a woman looking for a man, in the pilot episode of Love Boat: The Next Wave. She appeared as a counselor on sitcom The Wayans Bros..

In the early 2000s, Headley returned to daytime television playing the recurring roles of Felicia Boudreau on Guiding Light (2001–2002) and Heather Engle in The Bold and the Beautiful (2004–2005). In 2004, she played Mack Johnson's (portrayed by Steve Harvey) wife Jacqueline in the comedy film,  Johnson Family Vacation. In 2007, she appeared in the comedy-drama film Towelhead. She also had guest starring roles on Veronica Mars, House, Castle, and Switched at Birth.

In 2014, she joined the cast of Oprah Winfrey Network primetime soap opera, The Haves and the Have Nots created by Tyler Perry, playing District Attorney Jennifer Sallison. She was promoted to series regular as of season four. In 2019, she had a recurring role in On Becoming a God in Central Florida. Headley reprised her role of Queen Lisa Joffer from Coming to America in the sequel Coming 2 America in 2021.

Personal life 
Headley was married to actor/entertainer Christopher Martin, better known as "Play" from the hip-hop duo Kid N' Play, from May 1993 until they divorced in June 1995. From their brief marriage, Martin and Headley have a son.

Filmography

Film

Television

Documentary

Music video appearances

References

External links 
 

1964 births
20th-century American actresses
21st-century American actresses
Actresses from New York City
African-American actresses
American film actresses
American people of Trinidad and Tobago descent
American soap opera actresses
American television actresses
Living people
People from Queens, New York
20th-century African-American women
20th-century African-American people
21st-century African-American women
21st-century African-American people